May East (also known as Maria Elisa Capparelli Pinheiro) is a British/Brazilian educator, spatial planner, singer and songwriter. Over the years she has alternated voices of advocacy with voices of inspiration and considered herself an artivist.

Early Musical Career 1981 - 1992
East comes from a thriving artistic community stretching between São Paulo and Rio de Janeiro, Brazil. May East's art, be it in film, video, installation or music, expressed a deep concern for Brazil's environment both in the major cities and the country's vast interior, specially the rainforests of the Amazon.

As a musician, May East started her career as a singer in the band Gang 90 & Absurdettes in 1981. Their songs mixed new-wave with beatnik poetry and a female choir, inspired by the new-wave band The B-52s. Gang 90 is considered to be the predecessor of all Brazilian new-wave bands of the 80s.

In 1982 she collaborated with the independent TVDO videoart group and in partnership with the producer Nelson Motta co-produced the TV program Mocidade Independente for TV Bandeirantes.

In 1984 she released her first single, "Fire in the jungle/Índio", in Brazil, The Netherlands and Japan with EMI. Fire in the Jungle became a soundtrack for the film Areias Escaldantes directed by the independent director Francisco de Paula.

Some months later, her first album, Remota Batucada was launched. The music was an original brand of electronica, folk music, and new wave pop and was coined as "tribal ie-ie". East also released the albums Tabapora and Charites. She moved to England and then to the Scottish community of Findhorn, where she focused on ecological activism and began giving lectures and seminars. In the late 90s she released the albums: Cave of the Heart (with the Findhorn Community Chorus) and Cosmic Breath (with her ex-husband Craig Gibsone); and 1001 Faces (solo album) in 2002.

Sustainability Educator 1995 - present

May East has played a prominent role in developing relationships between the United Nations and the Findhorn Ecovillage, culminating in the establishment of CIFAL Scotland in 2006. The United Nations Institute for Training and Research affiliated training centre for Northern Europe operated for 10 years as a hub for capacity building, leadership and knowledge sharing between local and regional authorities, international organisations, the private sector and civil society under May's leadership.

She is the co-founder and has served as Chief Executive of Gaia Education, an international consortium of sustainability designers and educators from research and development centers for carbon-constrained lifestyles.  Gaia Education supports the delivery programmes in 55 countries, taking place in settings ranging from tribal and traditional communities to intentional ecovillages, and from urban slum to universities and R&D centres.

Since 2010 May East has developed a series of Project-Based Learning activities supporting indigenous and migrant communities and their traditions to survive in rapidly changing environments while enhancing their opportunities to become the designers of their desired future. The projects promote integrated approaches to land management for healthier soils, nutritional yields and enhanced climate resilience.

May was included three years in a row (2011, 2012, 2013) in the 100 Global Sustain Ability Leaders list,  devised and produced by Ken Hickson, Chairman/CEO of Sustain Ability Showcase Asia and ABC Carbon.  The list recognises 100 people around the world who have provided leadership in the field of sustainability.

May East received in 2019 the Women of the Decade in Sustainability & Leadership Award presented by the Women Economic Forum and All Ladies League.

Spatial Planner 2000 - present 
 
A UNITAR Fellow she has an MSc in Spatial Planning with specialisation in integrated approaches for the regeneration of abandoned towns in southern Italy, which makes the case for the reactivation of abandoned settlements, the so-called ghost towns in southern Europe, as an alternative housing solution that comes with embedded collective memory and offers ‘locally adaptable, culturally rooted’ opportunities for communities.  She has contributed a chapter of her findings to the book From Conflict to Inclusion in Housing: Interaction of Communities, Residents and Activists.

May is one of the co-founders of the Global Ecovillage Network and has lived for 15 years in the Findhorn Ecovillage where she established a new strand of Education for Sustainable Development offered to numerous university and school groups as well as by professional organisations and municipalities worldwide. May supported placing ecovillages in the UN agenda by weaving institutional and technical alliances with UNESCO, UNITAR, UN-Habitat and ECOSOC. She is also co-founder and mentor of the ‘eco-bairros’ – eco-neighbourhoods movement in Brazil.

She was an active Transition Town trainer since 2008, conducting trainings in China, Thailand, Israel, Portugal, Brazil, India, Senegal, Italy, Chile and UK, and facilitating participatory scenario planning, back-casting and climate change awareness raising activities with fragile and marginalised communities.

As a spatial planner she investigates and promotes the revisited role of women in urban  design and development and works with slums, tribal villages, hard to reach neighbourhoods and mining cities.

Since 2013 May East has been contributing articles to The Scotsman
The Guardian, the Scientific Journal of the European Ecocycles Society
and Sustainability (journal) published by MDPI''

References

External links
An Agreement for the opening of CIFAL Findhorn. UNITAR DCP announcement.

Living people
20th-century Brazilian women singers
20th-century Brazilian singers
Women educators
1956 births